Murder in Trinidad is a 1934 American pre-Code drama film directed by Louis King and starring Nigel Bruce, Heather Angel, Victor Jory, and Murray Kinnell.

Cast
 Nigel Bruce as Bertram Lynch
 Heather Angel as Joan Cassell
 Victor Jory as Howard Sutter
 Murray Kinnell as Colonel Bruce Cassell
 Douglas Walton as Gregory Bronson
 J. Carrol Naish - Duval
 Claude King as Sir Ellery Bronson - Governor
 Pat Somerset as Inspector Henley
 Francis Ford as Davenant
 John Davidson as Gookol Moah
 Noble Johnson as Queechie

References

External links

1934 films
1934 drama films
Films directed by Louis King
American drama films
Films set in Trinidad and Tobago
American black-and-white films
Fox Film films
1930s English-language films
1930s American films